Washingtonville is a village in the town of Blooming Grove,  Orange County, New York, United States. The population was 5,657 at the 2020 census. It is part of the Poughkeepsie–Newburgh–Middletown, NY Metropolitan Statistical Area as well as the larger New York–Newark–Bridgeport, NY-NJ-CT-PA Combined Statistical Area. The village is named in honor of George Washington.

History

Washingtonville was first settled in 1731. The village maintained a slow but steady growth during the second half of the 18th century. In 1809, John Jaques, a boot and shoemaker, set up his shop in this tiny settlement of nine houses, then known as "Little York." In 1839 he established Brotherhood Winery, now the oldest continuously operating winery in the United States.	

In its earlier years, Washingtonville was called "Matthews Field," even before it was known as Little York. A part of the Rip Van Dam patent, it was sold to Vincent Matthews in 1721. Matthews was the first white European settler of the region. Its earliest known inhabitant was an Indian by the name of Moringamus, whose wigwam or tepee was once pitched in back of where the Coleman bottled-gas plant is located now.

Samuel Moffat built a trading post on the village square in 1811 at the junction of the New Windsor and Blooming Grove Turnpike with the Goshen Road. His son David later endowed Moffat Library on the spot. The hamlet began to prosper with a tannery, grist and plaster mills. A hotel was needed and Samuel Moffat built his Washington Tavern in 1818. The same year Samuel and John Jaques bestowed the village with a new name, Washingtonville, in honor of the late general and first president of the United States. George Washington was said to have come through and watered his horse at the trough which had been located under an elm tree in the center of the village.	

Washingtonville grew after 1850, when the New York, Lake Erie and Western Railway built its branch through the village. Incorporated in 1895, the village had become an important dairying center where two creameries, Borden's (later used as a bus garage for the Washingtonville Central School District) and the Farmers Cooperative Market on South Street, several groceries, a bank, feed and lumber dealers, wagon shops, furniture makers and a hub shop all prospered. Its greatest growth in that time occurred in the seventh and eighth decades.

C.R. Shons opened up a cooperative on Depot Street and also had a large orchard on Goshen Avenue. Thomas Fulton's grist mill was destroyed by fire in the early 1900s. Hugh Lunney had his slaughterhouse on Goshen Avenue, near where the Spear Printing Company plant was, and also had a large ice house beside the point to Coopers Creek, harvesting ice for commercial use from the pond in the winter.

Borden's Creamery maintained a bottling plant and its refrigerator cars, loaded with milk, were shipped to Greycourt (Harriman) on either the Erie freight or passenger runs. This firm cut its ice from the small pond south of its creamery, storing it in the ice house on the east side of the plant.

Geography
The village developed on each side of Moodna Creek, a tributary of the Hudson River. It is prone to seasonal flooding. There are also three lakes in the village, none of these have a formal name. 

Washingtonville is at the junction of highways NY-94 and NY-208.

The tallest point in the village is approximately 500 feet and is located on the crest of Capital Drive, the lowest point is the easterly most section of the Moodna Creek in the village, at 295 feet.

Demographics

As of the census of 2010, there were 5,899 people, 2,177 households, and 1,514 families residing in the village. The population density was 2,300.2 people per square mile (889.4/km2). There were 2,044 housing units at an average density of 803.6 per square mile (310.7/km2). The racial makeup of the village was 80.3% White, 8.22% African American, 0.46% Native American, 2.51% Asian, 6.15% from other races, and 2.36% from two or more races. Hispanic or Latino of any race were 18.27% of the population.

There were 2,177 households, out of which 35.9% had children under the age of 18 living with them, 55.5% were married couples living together, 17.4% had a female householder with no husband present, 9.2% had a male householder with no wife present and 30.5% were non-families. 26.6% of all households were made up of individuals, and 15.4% had someone living alone who was 65 years of age or older. The average household size was 2.71 and the average family size was 3.32.

In the village, the population was spread out, with 25.2% under the age of 18, 5.7% from 20 to 24, 22.7% from 25 to 44, 30.4% from 45 to 64, and 13.3% who were 65 years of age or older. The median age was 41.1 years. For every 100 females, there were 93.9 males. For every 100 females age 18 and over, there were 90.5 males.

The median income for a household in the village was $62,568, and the median income for a family was $69,145. Males had a median income of $57,552 versus $39,958 for females. The per capita income for the village was $24,036. About 1.6% of families and 3.7% of the population were below the poverty line, including 2.9% of those under age 18 and 12.0% of those age 65 or over.

Government 
The Village of Washingtonville consists of an Elected Mayor and five elected trustees that serve on a board. Elections are held every two years for these positions and those who serve must be village residents.

The village also has a Zoning, Planning, and Architectural Review Board. These consist of five appointed members each. 

The Village collects its own taxes separate from that of the town. With these taxes it manages a department of public works, a water and sewer department, police department, municipal services, public parks, parking lots, and more.

Police 
The Village Of Washingtonville Police Department was formally founded as per the village code in late 1974. They settled into their current headquarters located in the old Monell Engine Company fire station. Prior to this the police department was stationed out of a small booth located in the center of the Village. The booth has been restored and sits where it first was in the center of a traffic circle. The first officer for the department was formally appointed in 1929. The first chief of police would be hired in 1932. 

Today the department consist of 20 full and part time officers as well as 4 dispatchers / clerks and 1 crossing guard. Of these 20 officers, there is one chief, three sergeants, two detectives, and a K9 unit. The village police dog is named Jax, after John Jaques founder of the Brotherhood Winery.

Education
Washingtonville Central School District is made up of five schools; Washingtonville High School, Washingtonville Middle School, Little Britain Elementary School, Taft Elementary School, and Round Hill Elementary School. Three of these are located in Washingtonville. Those being the districts High School, Middle School and Taft Elementary School

Completed in 1933, the current Washingtonville Middle School housed all the grades of Kindergarten through 12th grade. Little Britain was adjacent to Stewart Air Force Base, and was only for children whose parents were in the military.  The air base has long since been closed, but military personnel are still housed in new housing units located just west of Little Britain Elementary.  The high school has undergone several renovations, the last completed in 2010. In addition to adding on classrooms, three computer labs were also added, including a Mac Lab.

The district's sports teams are the Washingtonville Wizards, and the mascot portrayed on murals and other artwork at the high school is named Merlin.

Notable people
 Brian Cashman, general manager of the New York Yankees
 Mel Gibson, actor and director (as a child before moving to Australia)
 Tony Gilroy, writer and director
 James Mangold, director and screenwriter
 Scott Pioli, National Football League executive
 Naomi Sewell Richardson, founder of Delta Sigma Theta, one of the oldest African American Sororities in the United States
 Dennis Smith, FDNY firefighter and author.

References

External links

 Village of Washingtonville, NY
 Washingtonville, NY 9/11 Memorial

Villages in New York (state)
Villages in Orange County, New York
Populated places established in 1731
Poughkeepsie–Newburgh–Middletown metropolitan area